Cefuroxime, sold under the brand name Zinacef among others, is a second-generation cephalosporin antibiotic used to treat and prevent a number of bacterial infections. These include pneumonia, meningitis, otitis media, sepsis, urinary tract infections, and Lyme disease. It is used by mouth or by injection into a vein or muscle.

Common side effects include nausea, diarrhea, allergic reactions, and pain at the site of injection. Serious side effects may include Clostridium difficile infection, anaphylaxis, and Stevens–Johnson syndrome. Use in pregnancy and breastfeeding is believed to be safe. It is a second-generation cephalosporin and works by interfering with a bacteria's ability to make a cell wall resulting in its death.

Cefuroxime was patented in 1971, and approved for medical use in 1977. It is on the World Health Organization's List of Essential Medicines. In 2020, it was the 325th most commonly prescribed medication in the United States, with more than 800thousand prescriptions.

Medical uses
Cefuroxime is active against many bacteria including susceptible strains of Staphylococci and Streptococci, as well as a range of gram negative organisms. As with the other cephalosporins, it is susceptible to beta-lactamase, although as a second-generation variety, it is less so. Hence, it may have greater activity against Haemophilus influenzae, Neisseria gonorrhoeae, and Lyme disease. Unlike other second-generation cephalosporins, cefuroxime can cross the blood–brain barrier.

A systematic review found high quality evidence that injecting the eye with cefuroxime after cataract surgery will lower the chance of developing endophthalmitis after surgery.

Side effects
Cefuroxime is generally well tolerated, and its side effects are usually transient. If ingested after food, this antibiotic is both better absorbed and less likely to cause its most common side effects of diarrhea, nausea, vomiting, headaches/migraines, dizziness, and abdominal pain compared to most antibiotics in its class.

Although a widely stated cross-allergic risk of about 10% exists between cephalosporins and penicillin, recent assessments have shown no increased risk for a cross-allergic reaction for cefuroxime and several other second-generation or later cephalosporins.

Chemistry
Cefuroxime axetil is an acetoxyethyl ester prodrug of cefuroxime which is effective when taken by mouth. It is a second-generation cephalosporin.

Trade names
In the U.S. it is marketed as Zinacef by Covis Pharmaceuticals since the company acquired the U.S. rights to the product from GSK. GSK had continued marketing a pediatric oral suspension as Ceftin; however, this presentation was discontinued as of 24 June 2017.

In Bangladesh, it is available as Kilbac by Incepta, Axim by Aristopharma, Rofurox by Radiant and Xorimax by Sandoz. In India, it is available as Ceftum and "Cefuall" by Allencia Biosciences in tablet form and Supacef  in injection form by GSK. In Poland, it is available as Zamur by Mepha, subsidiary of Teva Pharmaceutical Industries. In Australia, the "first generic" form of Cefuroxime axetil, Pharmacor Cefuroxime (tablets) from Pharmacor Pty Ltd, was registered on 27 March 2017, by the Therapeutic Goods Administration. Cefuroxime axetil is also available (in two strengths) as granules for oral suspension from Aspen Pharmacare Australia Pty Ltd under the brand name Zinnat cefuroxime.

References

External links
 

Acetaldehyde dehydrogenase inhibitors
Carbamates
Cephalosporin antibiotics
Enantiopure drugs
2-Furyl compounds
Ketoximes
Wikipedia medicine articles ready to translate
World Health Organization essential medicines